Samuel David Aston (born 7 June 1993) is an English actor, who has portrayed the role of Chesney Brown on the ITV soap opera Coronation Street since 2003.

Career 
Aston made his television debut at the age of five, as an extra in Eddie Mountain. He also appeared in Where the Heart Is and The Bill. In 2003, he was cast in the role of Chesney Brown on the ITV soap opera Coronation Street after four auditions.

In 2004, Aston was awarded Best Newcomer at the National Television Awards. The following year, Aston won Best Dramatic Performance for a Young Actor or Actress at the British Soap Awards. In October 2005, Aston presented the Queen with a bouquet at a party to celebrate fifty years of ITV. He appeared as Horrid Henry in the Children's Party At The Palace, an event to celebrate the 80th birthday of Queen Elizabeth II in June 2006. Aston has also appeared on All Star Family Fortunes with his family.

Personal life 
In 2017, Aston became engaged to yoga teacher Briony Gardner. He proposed to her in front of 250 spectators at an annual charity golf dinner, that he hosts with co stars Andy Whyment and Alan Halsall, at the Worsley Park Marriott Hotel in Salford. In May 2020, they announced that they were expecting their first child. In October 2021, they announced that they were expecting their second child.

References

External links
 

1993 births
21st-century English male actors
Living people
English male soap opera actors
English male child actors
People from Bacup
Male actors from Lancashire
People educated at Haslingden High School